Roger Damon Price (born 1941) is a British former television producer, director and writer active in the United Kingdom, Canada, and the United States. He has created children's television series in all three countries.

He created the children's science fiction series The Tomorrow People, Junior Points of View, the British children's sketch variety shows You Must Be Joking! (1974-1976), Pauline's Quirkes (1976) (both of which had Flintlock as their house band) and You Can't Be Serious (1978) for Thames Television, the American sketch comedy Don't Look Now, co-created the pilot episode UFO Kidnapped, the teen sketch comedy Turkey Television and the Canadian sketch comedy You Can't Do That on Television, which became hugely successful on Nickelodeon in the United States.

He collaborated with other producers including Geoffrey Darby and Geraldine Laybourne, the latter of whom would go on to become president of Nickelodeon. He is now retired from the industry and lives in Canada.

It was on You Can't Do That on Television where Darby and Price created and started dumping green slime, which has become an icon of Nickelodeon.

Writing credits

Awards and nominations

References

Further reading

External links 
 

1941 births
Living people
British television producers
Canadian television producers
Place of birth missing (living people)
English science fiction writers
English television writers